is a former Japanese footballer who last featured for Kagoshima United FC.

Career
After being a senator for Kagoshima United FC, he retired in January 2020.

Club statistics
Updated to 23 February 2020.

References

External links
Profile at Kagoshima United FC

1988 births
Living people
National Institute of Fitness and Sports in Kanoya alumni
Association football people from Kagoshima Prefecture
Japanese footballers
J2 League players
J3 League players
Japan Football League players
Gainare Tottori players
Kagoshima United FC players
Association football midfielders
People from Kagoshima